Naomi Rono, is a Kenyan  public policy professional and development economist, who works as an Adviser in the office of the executive director at World Bank Group, based in Washington, DC.

Background and education
She was born in Kenya and attended Kenyan schools for her pre-university education. She attended Strathmore University, graduating with a Bachelor of Commerce (BCom) degree, in 2006. She later obtained a postgraduate Diploma in Public Administration, obtained in 2013 from the Australian National University (ANU), in Canberra. The next year she obtained a Master of Public Policy (MPA) degree, also from ANU. She also holds Post Graduate Certification in Development Economics and International Development, awarded by the University of Amsterdam in 2014.

Work experience
For the first four years of her career, she worked as an Accountant and Projects Administrator at "IQplus Kenya Limited", a company that offers automation solutions for books of accounts and key business operations, based in Nairobi, from March 2007 until June 2011. Thereafter, for a period of six years, from August 2011 until July 2017, she was employed as a Senior Policy Analyst at the Institute of Certified Public Accountants of Kenya (ICPAK), a public institution based in Nairobi and mandated to develop and regulate the accountancy profession in Kenya. In August 2017, she was appointed as an Adviser in the Office of the Executive Director of the World Bank Group, where she still serves as of November 2017.

Other considerations
In 2017 Rono was named among the "Top 40 Women Under 40 in Kenya", by the Business Daily Africa, an English-language daily business newspaper.

See also
 Susan Oguya
 Shitsama Nyamweya
 Borna Nyaoke-Anoke

References

External links
Website of the World Bank Group

1982 births
21st-century Kenyan businesswomen
21st-century Kenyan businesspeople
21st-century Kenyan economists
Strathmore University alumni
Australian National University alumni
University of Amsterdam alumni
Living people